Regards to the Man in the Moon is a 1981 children's picture book by American author and illustrator Ezra Jack Keats.

The book was published by Viking Children's Books.

Plot summary
Louie is unhappy because the other kids call his father “the junk man.” But his father knows it is not just junk. “All a person needs is some imagination! And a little of that stuff can take you right out of this world!” So Louie builds a spaceship fueled entirely by imagination—and blasts off into an amazing adventure.

1981 children's books
American picture books
Books by Ezra Jack Keats
Science fiction picture books